West Hattiesburg is an unincorporated area and census-designated place (CDP) in Lamar County, Mississippi, west of the city of Hattiesburg and east of the community of Oak Grove. It is part of the Hattiesburg metropolitan area. It had a decline in population from 6,305 at the 2000 census to 5,909 at the 2010 census.

Geography
West Hattiesburg is in northeastern Lamar County and is bordered to the north, east, and south by the city of Hattiesburg. Of the CDP's area in 2019, or 0.31%, are water. Lairds Lake is the main water body in the community.

Demographics

2020 census

As of the 2020 United States census, there were 6,006 people, 2,387 households, and 1,478 families residing in the CDP.

2000 census
As of the census of 2000, there were 6,305 people, 4,464 households, and 2,601 families residing in the CDP. The population density was 892.0 people per square mile (377.3/km). There were 2,633 housing units at an average density of 372.5/sq mi (143.8/km). The racial makeup of the CDP was 74.88% White, 22.11% African American, 0.06% Native American, 1.63% Asian, 0.29% from other races, and 1.03% from two or more races. Hispanic or Latino of any race were 1.38% of the population.

There were 2,464 households, out of which 32.9% had children under the age of 18 living with them, 47.3% were married couples living together, 14.0% had a female householder with no husband present, and 35.0% were non-families. 24.0% of all households were made up of individuals, and 6.7% had someone living alone who was 65 years of age or older. The average household size was 2.50 and the average family size was 3.00.

In the CDP, the population was spread out, with 25.5% under the age of 18, 15.7% from 18 to 24, 30.8% from 25 to 44, 19.2% from 45 to 64, and 8.8% who were 65 years of age or older. The median age was 30 years. For every 100 females, there were 91.1 males. For every 100 females age 18 and over, there were 87.2 males.

The median income for a household in the CDP was $44,663, and the median income for a family was $68,287. Males had a median income of $49,552 versus $43,873 for females. The per capita income for the CDP was $38,988. None of the families and none of the population were living below the poverty line, including no under eighteens and none of those over 64.

Incorporation
A movement for incorporation has been attempted repeatedly over the years, but the courts have never ruled on the substance of it. The issues involve getting articles of incorporation which all would agree to, as well as who wants incorporation (who will profit, who will end up paying more in taxes).

Proponents say incorporation will benefit all residents, but the opposition says it will only benefit the persons who hold that property which is yet to be fully developed within the real estate market over the next few years. Another argument against incorporation is that the proposal and its budget outline didn't fully account for the additional expenditures and costs of running the new city. Proponents counter that the overall cost will be lower, because of a more distributed risk amongst homeowners, who would essentially bear about 80% of the additional taxes to support this city.

http://www.hattiesburgamerican.com has extensive archives about this issue, including opinion columns authored by the actual people engaged in the debate both pro and con. It is a good case study in local politics.

Origins of "West Hattiesburg"
West Hattiesburg was a rarely used term by residents, and was first popularized by out of towners who saw the area listed on Google Maps with that name, with the original source of the name from the U.S. Census Bureau. Residents of the area are gradually picking up the term.

West Hattiesburg should not be confused with Oak Grove, which is directly to the west but considered its own area. This can be complicated because public school students in West Hattiesburg are still enrolled in Oak Grove’s school system.

Roads
Two major highways pass near West Hattiesburg. Interstate 59 forms the eastern border of the community, and U.S. Highway 98 passes just north of the current CDP, through land annexed by the city of Hattiesburg. Due to recent population growth and migration the area (and Lamar County) the traffic has gotten worse on Highway 98, which has led to Highway 98 being widened from 4 to 6 lanes and recently 4 to 8 lanes (only near Interstate 59) in the area. Three major roads parallel U.S. Highway 98 (4th Street, Oak Grove Road, and Lincoln Road) have also been victim to large inflows of traffic due to the large amount of motorists trying to avoid major traffic on 98.

Education

The Lamar County School District serves West Hattiesburg via neighboring Oak Grove's school system. There have been calls, however, for the district to build West Hattiesburg its own schools due to overpopulation.

High school
 Oak Grove High School (Grades 9-12)

Middle school
 Oak Grove Middle School (Grades 6-8)

Elementary schools
 Oak Grove Upper Elementary School (Grades 4-5)
 Oak Grove Lower Elementary School (Grades 2-3)
 Long Leaf Elementary School (Grades K-5)
 Oak Grove Primary School (Grades K-1)

References

Census-designated places in Lamar County, Mississippi
Census-designated places in Mississippi
Hattiesburg metropolitan area